Power of Legacy is a Ugandan drama television series created by Edris Matu Segawa  and directed by George Kihumbah. It stars Tania Shakirah Kankindi, Sarah Kisawuzi, Jonan Kisibo, Michael Wawuyo, Housen Mushema as the main cast. The series’ first season premiered on 31 March 2019 on NTV Uganda and the second season premiered September 8, 2019 and aired two episodes per week.

Plot
Mr. Batte, the patriarch of a wealthy family with a hotel business chain in Kampala has to resign but there are so many contenders to replace him. Meanwhile, the family must preserve its empire and bond as each member is caught in a web of murder, betrayal, search for love and social prejudice. They have to protect the family's Legacy.

Cast

Series overview
{| class="wikitable" style="text-align:center"
|-
! style="padding: 0 8px;" colspan="2" rowspan="2"| Season
! style="padding: 0 8px;" rowspan="2"| Episodes
! colspan="2"| Originally aired 
|-
! style="padding: 0 8px;"| First aired
! style="padding: 0 8px;"| Last aired
|-
 |style="background: #F9BA00;"|
 | 1
 | 24
 | style="padding:0 8px;"| 
 | style="padding:0 8px;"| 
|- 
 |style="background: #000000;"|
 | 2
 | 24
 | style="padding:0 8px;"| 
 | style="padding:0 8px;"| 
|-
 |style="background: #A62325;"|
 | 3
 | 24
 | style="padding:0 8px;"| 
 | style="padding:0 8px;"| 
|-
|}

References

External links
 

Ugandan drama television series
2010s Ugandan television series
2019 Ugandan television series debuts
NTV Uganda original programming